"Forever Love" is Tohoshinki's 14th Japanese single. The single was released on November 14, 2007.

Track listing

CD
 "Forever Love"
 "Day Moon: ハルダル"
 "Forever Love" (A cappella version)
 "Forever Love" (Less Vocal)
 "Day Moon: ハルダル" (Less Vocal)

DVD
 "Forever Love" (Video clip)
 Off Shot Movie

Release history

Live performances
 2007.11.03 - Music Fair 21
 2007.11.16 - NHK Music Japan
 2008.02.22 - NHK Music Japan

Charts

Oricon sales chart (Japan)

Korea monthly foreign albums & singles

Korea yearly foreign albums & singles

References

External links
 http://toho-jp.net/

2000s ballads
2007 singles
2007 songs
TVXQ songs
Avex Trax singles
Rhythm Zone singles
Pop ballads
Japanese-language songs